Brachionidium folsomii is a species of orchid native to Central America (Costa Rica, Guatemala, Panama).

References

External links
 
 

folsomii
Orchids of Guatemala
Orchids of Costa Rica
Orchids of Panama
Plants described in 1982